Paul Norton is a former professional rugby league footballer who played in the 1970s and 1980s.

Playing career

County honours
Paul Norton was an unused interchange/substitute, i.e. number 14, for Yorkshire while at Castleford in the 13–17 defeat by Cumberland at Derwent Park, Workington on 29 August 1979.

County Cup Final appearances
Paul Norton played as an interchange/substitute, i.e. number 15, (replacing  Alan Hardy) in Castleford's 10–5 victory over Bradford Northern in the 1981 Yorkshire County Cup Final during the 1981–82 season at Headingley Rugby Stadium, Leeds, on Saturday 3 October 1981.

References

External links
Paul Norton Memory Box Search at archive.castigersheritage.com

Living people
Castleford Tigers players
English rugby league players
Place of birth missing (living people)
Rugby league locks
Rugby league second-rows
Year of birth missing (living people)
Yorkshire rugby league team players